East Rockingham may refer to:

 East Rockingham, North Carolina, U.S.
 East Rockingham, Western Australia
 East Rockingham High School, Elkton, Virginia, U.S.